The following is a list of superheroes with names or overt motifs relating to the United States of America, usually (though not necessarily) with an overtly patriotic character. Characters are listed alphabetically by publisher.

A.C. Comics
Captain Freedom
Fighting Yank
Miss Victory
Yankee Girl

Amalgam Comics
American Belle
Super-Soldier

Archie Comics
Captain Flag
Shield
Lancelot Strong

Crestwood Publications
Yank & Doodle (Prize Publications)

Dark Horse Comics
The American

DC Comics
Agent Liberty
American Eagle (Zoo Crew member)
The Americommando (Crusaders member)
The Americommando (Tex Thompson)
The Comedian
Commander Steel
Fighting American
General Glory
Lady Liberty
Liberty Belle
Major Victory I
Major Victory II
Mayflower
Minute-Man
Miss America
Mister America
Peacemaker
Red, White and Blue
Silent Majority
Skyman
Skyrocket
Sparkler
Stars/Stargirl
Star-Spangled Kid
Stripesy/S.T.R.I.P.E.
Superman
Uncle Sam
Wonder Woman
Yankee Poodle
See also Freedom Fighters, Freedom's Ring, Force of July, Justice League of America, Justice Society of America.

Dynamite Entertainment
 Homelander

Fox Features Syndicate
The Eagle
U.S. Jones

G-Man Comics
American Eagle III
Champion of Liberty²
Lady Victory
Sgt. Flag
Simon N. Kirby, The Agent

Heroic Publications
Liberty Girl

Impact Comics
American Shield
Original Shield
Shield

Image Comics
The Badge (Big Bang Comics)
Mister U.S. (Big Bang Comics)
Patriot/Flagg (Jason Miller) (Rising Stars)
Sgt. States, America's Fighting Foot Soldier (Jack Staff)
Superpatriot
Liberty & Justice
The Defender of Liberty (Battle Hymn)
The Proud American (Battle Hymn)

Marvel Comics
American Ace
American Dream
American Eagle
Battlestar
Blue Eagle
Bucky/Captain America
Captain America
Captain America (Isaiah Bradley)
Citizen V
Falcon/Captain America
Free Spirit
Iron Patriot
Jack Flag
Josiah X
Miss America (America Chavez)
Miss America (Madeline Joyce)
Nuke
Old Soldier (Supreme Power)
Patriot
Patriot (Jeffrey Mace)
Phantom Eagle
The Spirit of '76
The Spirit of '76 (Crusaders member))
U.S. Agent
 Defender (Private Don Stevens) Timely Comics
Rusty (Defender's Sidekick) Timely Comics
US Archer
The Yankee Clipper
See also Liberty Legion, Young Allies

Nedor Comics/Terra Obscura
American Crusader
American Eagle
The Fighting Yank
The Fighting Spirit
The Liberator
See also Society of Modern American Science Heroes

Organic Comix
ShieldMaster

New England Comics
American Maid (The Tick supporting character)

Wildstorm

America's Best Comics
Miss America
The First American (Tomorrow Stories)
U.S.Angel (Tomorrow Stories)
Spirit of '76 (Top 10: The Forty-Niners)
See also America's Best, The Strongmen of America, Society of Modern American Science Heroes and Nedor Comics above.

Homage Comics
The All American (Astro City)
The Frontiersman (Astro City)
The Old Soldier (Astro City)

Multiple Publishers
Fighting American (Awesome Entertainment, DC Comics, Harvey Comics, Marvel Comics, Prize Comics, Titan Comics)

Battle Fever J
Miss America (Diane Martin)
Miss America (Maria Nagisa)

Samurai Flamenco
Mr. Justice

Street Fighter
Guile

Overwatch
Soldier 76

References

United States-themed superheroes